Derby County Football Club is a professional football club in Derby, England, which competes in League One, the third tier of English football. Derby has played home matches at Pride Park since 1997. They were one of the twelve founder members of the Football League in 1888, and are one of only ten clubs to have competed in every season of it, with all but five of those being in the top two divisions.

The club was founded in 1884 as an offshoot of Derbyshire County Cricket Club. In the 1970s, it twice won the First Division and competed in European competitions, reaching the European Cup semi-finals. The club also  finished League runners-up twice in the 1930s, and won the FA Cup in 1946.

The club's home colours have been black and white since the 1890s. The team's nickname, The Rams, honours its links with the First Regiment of Derby Militia, its mascot being a ram, and its regimental song. They have a long-standing rivalry with Nottingham Forest, with whom they contest the East Midlands derby.

History

Beginning and early success
Derby County F.C. was formed in 1884 as an offshoot of Derbyshire County Cricket Club in an attempt to give players and supporters a winter interest as well as secure the cricket club extra revenue. The original intention was to name the club "Derbyshire County F.C." to highlight the link, though the Derbyshire FA, formed in 1883, objected on the grounds it was too long and therefore would not have been understood by the fans who may mistake it for a Derbyshire FA team. Playing their home matches at the cricket club's Racecourse Ground, 1884–85 saw the club undertake an extensive programme of friendly matches, the first of which was a 6–0 defeat to Great Lever on 13 September 1884. The club's first competitive match came in the 1885 FA Cup, where they lost 7–0 at home to Walsall Town.

Arguably the most important match in the club's history came in the following season's FA Cup, when a 2–0 victory over Aston Villa, already an emerging force in English football, established Derby County on the English football map, helping the club to attract better opposition for friendlies and, in 1888, an invitation into the inaugural Football League. The opening day of the first ever league season was 8 September 1888, when Derby came from 3–0 down away to Bolton Wanderers to win 6–3, though the club ultimately finished 10th out of 12 teams. In 1891, they absorbed another Derby club, Derby Midland, which had been a member of the Midland League, leaving them as Derby's sole professional football club. Steve Bloomer, generally considered to be Derby County's best-ever player, joined the club in 1892. In 1895, the club moved to a new stadium, the Baseball Ground (so called because it was previously used for baseball), which became their home for the next 102 years. It was then that the club adopted their now traditional home colours of black and white.

Although Derby were inconsistent in the league, they finished as runners-up to Aston Villa in 1896, and achieved a number of third-place finishes. They were a strong force in the FA Cup, appearing in three finals in six years around the turn of the 20th century, though lost all three, in 1898 (3–1 to Nottingham Forest), 1899 (4–1 to Sheffield United) and 1903 (6–0 to Bury).

Edwardian and interwar era
In 1906, Steve Bloomer was sold to Middlesbrough due to financial constraints, and Derby subsequently suffered its first ever relegation the following season, but under Jimmy Methven's management, they re-signed Bloomer and regained their First Division place in 1911. In 1914, they were again relegated, but instantly won the Second Division to earn promotion, though World War I meant they had to wait until 1919 to play First Division football again. After two seasons, they were relegated yet again in 1921. However, the appointment of George Jobey in 1925 kick-started a successful period for the Rams and, after promotion in 1926, the club became a formidable force, with high finishes from the late 1920s and all through the 1930s, including finishing as runners-up twice.

Derby were one of several clubs to close down after the outbreak of World War II but restarted in the early 1940s, in part due to the persistence of Jack Nicholas and Jack Webb. Aided by the recruitment of Raich Carter and Peter Doherty, who had both been stationed in Loughborough during the war, Derby were one step ahead of the opposition when competitive football resumed with the 1946 FA Cup and won their first major trophy with a 4–1 victory over Charlton Athletic.

Post-war success and decline
The league restarted the following season after a break due to World War II and, under the management of Stuart McMillan, as well as twice breaking the British transfer record to sign Billy Steel and Johnny Morris to replace Carter and Doherty, finished fourth and third in the 1948 and 1949 seasons respectively, before a steady decline set in and the club was relegated in 1953, after nearly 30 years in the top flight, and again in 1955 to drop to the third tier of English football for the first time in their history. Harry Storer led Derby back into the second tier at the second attempt in 1957, though the club progressed no further over the next decade under either Storer or his successor, former Derby player Tim Ward.

Brian Clough era
In 1967, Brian Clough and Peter Taylor took over and led Derby to its greatest glory. Starting at 18th in the Second Division in 1968, Clough and Taylor acquired Alan Hinton, Roy McFarland, and John O'Hare, then clinched the influential signing of Dave Mackay to lead the club to 1st place in 1969, and promotion to the First Division. Derby went on to finish fourth in 1970, were banned from competing in Europe due to financial irregularities in 1971, and won their first ever Football League Championship in 1972. Though Derby did not retain their title the following season, they did reach the semi-finals of the European Cup, where they lost to Juventus. Clough's frequent outspoken comments against football's establishment eventually led to him falling out with the board of directors at the club, and Clough and Taylor left in October 1973. Such was their impact on the club that, 37 years later, a 9 ft (2.75 metres) bronze statue of the pair was erected outside Pride Park in commemoration of their legacy.

Success and decline after Clough
Despite the departure of Clough and Taylor, Derby's league success was repeated in the 1974–75 season when they won the title under successor Dave Mackay, who had been a player under Clough when they had returned to the top flight in 1969. However, Derby's form declined towards the end of the 1970s and they went down to the Second Division in 1980 after a string of managers, including former Manchester United boss Tommy Docherty, unsettled the club trying desperately to maintain its place at the top of the First Division. Though they challenged well in their first season, Derby were soon hit hard by rising debts, falling attendances and dismal performances. Peter Taylor returned to the Baseball Ground as manager in early 1983 and kept Derby up that season, but he retired a year later just before Derby's relegation to the Third Division for only the second time in their history. However, Derby did manage to avoid going out of business, and they were soon under the ownership of wealthy businessman Robert Maxwell.

1980s revival and promotion to Premier League
After relegation to the Third Division in May 1984, the club appointed Arthur Cox as manager. Although they missed out on promotion in Cox's first season as manager, they then won back-to-back promotions and were back in the First Division for the 1987–88 season, with attendances also rising as the club's on-the-field fortunes and financial position improved. The financial backing of new chairman Robert Maxwell saw stars such as Peter Shilton, Mark Wright, Dean Saunders, Trevor Hebberd and Ted McMinn brought to the club and they finished fifth in the 1988–89 season.

A lack of any further investment from Maxwell quickly led to a decline and discontent amongst the club's fans, culminating in relegation back to the Second Division in 1991 when the club finished bottom of the First Division with just five wins all season. At this time, local newspaper businessman Lionel Pickering became the majority shareholder of the club, taking control just before Maxwell's death in November 1991. In 1992, Derby County paid £2.5 million for Notts County central defender Craig Short, at the time – and for five years afterwards – the most expensive player to be signed by a club outside the top flight, and indeed one of the highest fees paid by any English club for a player at the time. Other expensive signings included strikers Tommy Johnson and Marco Gabbiadini. Cox's resignation as manager in October 1993 saw the appointment of legendary former player Roy McFarland as manager. Derby reached the final of the Division One playoffs that season, but were beaten by local rivals Leicester City. McFarland was sacked a year later after Derby missed out on the playoffs, and his replacement was Jim Smith – a manager whose track record at his previous clubs included four promotions and an FA Cup semi-final appearance.

Although the 1995–96 season started slowly, the signing of sweeper Igor Štimac in the early autumn proved pivotal. Smith guided the Rams to a second-place finish and the Premier League, now the top flight of English football. During that season, it was announced Derby would be leaving the Baseball Ground after more than 100 years to move into a new all-seater stadium, following earlier plans to develop the Baseball Ground as a 26,000-seat stadium.

After finishing in 12th place in their first season back in the top flight, the club left the Baseball Ground, its home of 102 years, to move into the new 33,597-seat Pride Park Stadium for the 1997–98 season. The Baseball Ground was demolished six years later and a memorial was eventually erected in memory of its role in Derby city history.

Relegation from top flight and financial crisis
The club settled well into its new home as it recorded back-to-back top 10 finishes for the first time since their 1970s peak, before a sudden decline at the turn of the millennium saw three years of struggle. Smith resigned to be replaced by former players Colin Todd, who lasted just three months, and John Gregory, before the Rams were relegated after a six-year stay in the top flight, in 2002.

Derby County's relegation saw the club enter a serious financial crisis, which forced them to sell many key players. Gregory was later suspended from his managerial duties over alleged misconduct and former Ipswich Town boss George Burley was brought in. The club was put into receivership then sold in October 2003 for £3 to a group led by Jeremy Keith. After finishing 20th in the 2003–04 season, a dramatic improvement in the 2004–05 season saw Derby finish fourth in the Championship, qualifying for a promotion play-off spot, though they lost in the semi-finals to Preston North End. Soon afterwards, Burley resigned citing differences between himself and the board. He was replaced by Bolton Wanderers first team coach Phil Brown. In January 2006, Brown was sacked after a poor run of results. Terry Westley, the academy coach at the time, took over first-team duties until the end of the season and saved Derby from relegation.

Return to the Premier League and straight back to the Championship
In April 2006, a consortium of local businessmen led by former vice-chairman Peter Gadsby purchased the club, reducing its debt and returning Pride Park Stadium to the club's ownership in the process. In June 2006, former Preston North End boss Billy Davies was appointed Derby County's new permanent manager. In his first season, Davies took Derby to the Championship play-offs, where they beat Southampton on penalties in the semi-finals before defeating West Bromwich Albion 1–0 with a second-half Stephen Pearson goal at the new Wembley Stadium to secure a return to the Premier League and the associated £60 million windfall.

After failing to win any of their opening five matches of the season (one draw and four consecutive defeats), Derby scored their first victory with a 1–0 win over Newcastle, where Kenny Miller scored the only goal of the game. In October 2007, Peter Gadsby stepped down as chairman to be replaced by former Hull City owner Adam Pearson, who immediately began searching for investment from overseas. After a poor start to the season, manager Billy Davies left by mutual consent in November. He was succeeded by Paul Jewell, who failed to save the club as Derby suffered the Premier League's earliest ever relegation, in March, recorded the Premier League's lowest-ever points total, and equalled Loughborough's 108-year Football League record of going through an entire season with only one win, which occurred during the 1899–1900 season when Loughborough finished bottom of the Second Division. In January 2008, Derby was taken over by an international investment group led by General Sports and Entertainment, with Pearson remaining as de facto chairman.

Derby's match at home to Sheffield United on 13 September 2008 generated much media coverage as it was approaching a year since Derby's last league win, a run which saw the club break the English league record for most matches without a win. Just four days short of the anniversary of the 1–0 victory over Newcastle United, Rob Hulse scored against his former club as Derby ran out 2–1 winners, earning Paul Jewell his first league win as Derby boss at his 27th attempt. Despite taking the club to the League Cup semi-final, the club's first major cup semi-final since 1976, where Derby lost 4–3 to Manchester United over two legs, Jewell resigned as manager in December 2008 after a run of just two wins in 11 matches. He was replaced by Nigel Clough, son of former manager Brian Clough. Nigel Clough led the club to 18th place and safety. After four years of midtable obscurity, Clough was replaced by Steve McClaren in September 2013; McClaren led the club to a 3rd-place finish in the 2013–14 season, but lost the play-off final to Queens Park Rangers.

Play-off heartaches, administration and relegation
The following season local businessman Mel Morris assumed ownership of the club. Morris initially oversaw a level of spending unprecedented in Derby's history, breaking the club's transfer record four times in his first three years, but also oversaw an equally unprecedented managerial turnover, with nine managers in six years from June 2015. In that period, the club endured three unsuccessful play-off campaigns, failing in the semi-finals twice and losing in the 2019 final to Aston Villa. In May 2021, the club, by then managed by Wayne Rooney, narrowly avoided relegation to League One. Earlier, in October 2020, it was announced that Morris was intending to sell the club and was actively seeking new owners. A potential deal with a Middle Eastern-backed company was discontinued in March 2021, after which an agreed sale to a Spanish businessman, Erik Alonso, also fell through after doubts about Alonso's funding emerged, alongside possible EFL sanctions regarding breaches of financial fair play regulations and a deduction of nine points remained under consideration in mid-September 2021. On 8 July 2021, the EFL imposed a transfer embargo on the club, leaving Rooney with a squad of just nine contracted senior professionals. The EFL later relaxed the embargo but said any deals would have strict wage limits. Following a long-term injury to Colin Kazim-Richards in the early stage of the 2021–22 season, the club were given special dispensation by the EFL to bring in veteran defender Phil Jagielka and striker Sam Baldock.

On 17 September 2021, the club's board of directors announced that the club was to go into administration, and the EFL confirmed Derby faced a 12-point deduction. Having invested "in excess of £200m" in the club, owner Mel Morris apologised to fans and staff about the club going into administration. Relegated in May 2021, former Championship club Wycombe Wanderers considered legal action against Derby County following the administration announcement, as did Middlesbrough. On 22 September 2021, the club formally went into administration and were deducted 12 points, leaving them bottom of the Championship. During October and November 2021, former Derby owner Andy Appleby, US businessman Chris Kirchner, and Sandy and James Easdale, were named as interested parties as administrators looked for a buyer for the club, planning to shortlist three preferred bidders by the end of 2021. However, a quick sale was unlikely pending discussions with HMRC, and confirmation of Derby's full liabilities. On 16 November, the club had a further deduction of nine points for breaching EFL accounting rules, leaving the club on −3, 18 points from safety. A further three-point deduction, for breaches of EFL profitability and sustainability rules, was suspended. Derby and related companies were reported to owe £29.3m to HMRC. Other liabilities included a £20m loan from US investment group MSD Holdings, plus various football and trade creditors owed around £15m.

On 21 November 2021, Quantuma said it hoped to identify a preferred buyer "in the next two to three weeks", with Kirchner the only potential buyer to have publicly confirmed his interest. On 2 December, after press speculation that the club might go into liquidation due to the scale of its debts, Rooney insisted that was not an option. On 18 December, he said three bids had been received and a preferred bidder should be announced by Christmas, and administrators hoped to complete a sale "in or around February 2022". On 24 December, Kirchner withdrew his bid. Then, on 7 January 2022, former Newcastle United owner Mike Ashley was reported to be interested in buying the club.

On 14 January 2022, with no immediate prospect of Derby County's purchase (hampered by the legal actions involving Middlesbrough and Wycombe), the EFL gave administrators until 1 February 2022 to provide information about how they intended to fund the club until the end of the season. The Middlesbrough and Wycombe claims, if proved, could leave Derby with liabilities running into millions (the BBC suggested as much as £60 million), because football debts must be paid in full. Consequently, potential purchasers were unwilling to commit to buying the club. As a result, the BBC reported on 17 January that Derby's administrators could seek a legal ruling that the claims do not fall within the normal "football-related" agreements over issues such as transfer fees and ticket sales. Middlesbrough and Wycombe subsequently said they were willing to discuss a possible compromise. On 20 January, the club's administrators committed to providing the EFL with funding information "within days", after the EFL said "the club will run out of cash by February". The following day, another bid to buy the club, from the Binnie family, founders of US investment company Carlisle Capital, was reported, but the £28m offer did not include the stadium, against which the MSD Holdings loan was secured. Following the Binnie bid, and reports that former chairman Andy Appleby was working on an alternative bid that included the stadium, the EFL and administrators Quantuma were due to meet on 25 January to discuss the club's future.

On 27 January 2022, Quantuma and the EFL announced that administrators had been given an extra month to provide proof of how Derby would be funded for the rest of the season. The EFL also rejected Derby's efforts to reclassify its footballing debts relating to the Middlesbrough and Wycombe legal actions. On 3 February, a source close to the Binnie bid told the BBC they feared the club was heading for liquidation because of financial risks relating to the legal actions. During the January transfer window, nine players left Derby, which remained under a transfer embargo and seven points from safety in the Championship, after a defeat at Huddersfield. On 4 February, trying to "unlock the impasse" over Derby's sale, former owner, Mel Morris, invited Middlesbrough and Wycombe to take their compensation claims to the High Court against him personally. On 11 February, it was announced that Morris had reached a private "accord" with Middlesbrough's owner and details had been shared with the administrators, but there was no update regarding Wycombe's claim. As the 28 February deadline approached without news of a sale, the EFL called for an urgent funding update from Quantuma. On 1 March, it was reported the EFL had no plans to expel the club despite administrators missing the deadline, and a defeat at Cardiff City left Derby eight points from safety with 11 Championship games to play. On 2 March, the administrators said they had sought "further requests for clarity from prospective purchasers" and hoped to be able to name a preferred bidder "shortly". The EFL said the "lack of progress" in naming a preferred bidder, or providing proof of funding, was "threatening the very future of Derby County". Even after Quantuma provided a forecast showing the club had "sufficient cash" to get to the end of the season, the EFL still felt "a number of challenges" remained.

On 4 March 2022, Quantuma said it was in "active dialogue" with potential buyers: "Due to the complex nature of the mechanics of the bids received, it is necessary for us to work through each of these matters individually, to ensure the bids meet our terms of purchase. ... We remain confident that we will be in a position to name a preferred bidder shortly." However, on 10 March, the Binnie family ended their bid to buy the club after a £30 million offer was rejected by Quantuma as too low, with the administrators thought to be seeking bids of around £50 million. Meanwhile, and subject to completion of international paperwork, Derby sold Polish international winger, Kamil Jóźwiak, to US MLS side Charlotte FC for £2 million - funds that would help the club survive to the end of the season. A preferred bidder had still not been announced by the end of March 2022, with Quantuma disappointed at "attempts by some parties to delay and undermine the process". Manager Wayne Rooney said: "I don't know where the club's going, I don't know if the club's going to be here next season."

On 6 April 2022, with the club nine points from safety with six matches remaining, Chris Kirchner was confirmed by Quantuma as the preferred bidder, having recently renewed interest in Derby County following a failed attempt to buy Championship rivals Preston North End. The administrators said his offer "represents the best deal for creditors and one which will secure the long-term future of the club", but did not include the stadium (owned by former majority shareholder Mel Morris), about which further negotiation would be needed. The arrangements were also subject to review by the EFL. With games running out and a third spell of third-tier football looking increasingly likely, Rooney talked about the continuing transfer embargo ("You cannot just pick players out of thin air"), and a 15-point penalty remained a possibility if outstanding debts were not settled in line with EFL insolvency rules.

Following a defeat at QPR on 18 April 2022, Derby County were relegated to League One. With a final-day defeat by Cardiff City, the club ultimately finished 23rd on 34 points, seven points from safety. Kirchner subsequently confirmed that Derby's business plan would be handed to the EFL for approval on 22 April, with the club set to abide by EFL rules on paying creditors to avoid a 15-point penalty next season. On 28 April 2022, Rooney said he expected Kirchner's takeover to be completed within 10 days. Until the sale was agreed, and EFL checks had been completed, Derby remained under a transfer embargo, with only five first-team players contracted beyond June 2022. Rooney also said that Derby City Council was working towards a deal to purchase the club's ground, but on 8 May an "impasse" in negotiations over the ground's purchase was reported to be holding up the takeover deal, and the exclusivity period for the Kirchner takeover bid was extended. On 17 May 2022, Quantuma exchanged contracts for the club's sale to Kirchner with completion scheduled by 31 May 2022, later revised to 1 June 2022. Local businessmen, 'Team Derby' MPs and city council bosses continued to work on a deal to purchase Pride Park, so that the Kirchner takeover could be completed. However, the takeover remained incomplete into early June, and Kirchner was given until 5pm on Friday, 10 June 2022, to provide evidence that he could complete the club's purchase. Quantuma also engaged with other interested parties, including Mike Ashley, as "a contingency measure". The deadline passed without any confirmation from Kirchner, and the BBC said the hold-up related to funds awaiting anti-money laundering approvals. With fixture announcements imminent, the EFL sought to become more closely involved in the sale, "increasingly concerned" that the delays presented "a real risk to the integrity of next season's competition".

On 13 June 2022, Kirchner withdrew his bid to buy Derby County. Quantuma resumed negotiations with a consortium led by former chairman Andy Appleby. Mike Ashley was reported as having renewed his interest in purchasing the club, but had started a court action regarding comments allegedly made by Quantuma's Carl Jackson. Housebuilding tycoon, and former Wolves chairman, Steve Morgan, was also reported to be interested. Discussions were not reopened with the Binnie family, but at least eight groups were reportedly interested, but the EFL was prevented by privacy agreements from dealing directly with bidders. The Appleby group submitted its bid on 16 June 2022, with Appleby potentially a "trusted" buyer after years of previous involvement. Quantuma had earlier revealed that HMRC's claim for unpaid taxes had risen to £36m, while the club owed finance company MSD £24m. Quantuma had also incurred costs of £2.1m in the first six months of the club's administration. Payment of the club's June wages bill was likely to require external funding, adding to the costs to be borne by any successful bidder. It was also unclear if any bidder would pay the sum Kirchner had agreed to, including paying football creditors in full and a minimum of 25p in the pound to other creditors, raising the potential of a 15-point deduction for Derby in the 2022–23 season. On 24 June 2022, Rooney quit as Derby's manager with immediate effect; Liam Rosenior became interim manager.

On 26 June 2022, after Derbyshire-based property developer David Clowes had purchased Pride Park, his bid to buy the club was accepted, and Quantuma granted Clowes preferred bidder status. The administrators said Clowes's offer complied with EFL insolvency policy, meaning Derby would avoid a further points deduction. Completion of the acquisition of the business and the assets of the club was initially targeted for 29 June; the deal - and the club's exit from administration - was eventually confirmed on 1 July 2022, though some constraints on transfers were agreed by the EFL and Derby's new owners.

Club identity

Crest

Like most old football clubs, Derby County did not initially have any badge displayed on their shirts. Their first badge was introduced in 1924. The badge consisted of a circular shield split into three equally sized sections, representing the club, its fans and the area, all containing items traditionally associated with the city of Derby: a Tudor rose and a crown in one section, a buck in a park in the second and a ram's head in the final section. The badge was worn on the players' shirts for just two seasons before they reverted to plain shirts.

By 1934, another badge had been introduced. This time it was a traditionally shaped shield, again with three sections. The buck in the park had been removed and the rose and the crown had been split up and now occupied a section each. The ram's head also remained and was now given the largest section of the shield. The badge never appeared on the players' shirts. The shield was modified in 1946 when the rose and crown were removed and replaced with the letters "DC" (Derby County) and "FC" (Football Club) respectively. The badge, right, was featured on the player's shirts from its introduction onwards, though the ram's head on its own was used from the late 1960s (the full shield, however, remained the club's official logo).

A new club badge was introduced in 1971, featuring a more modern design that, with modifications, is still in use. The badge initially consisted of a stylised white ram facing left. The badge was first modified slightly in 1979 to include the text "Derby County FC" under the ram (though the ram remained on its own on away kits). In 1982, the ram turned to face to the right and the text under it was removed. The ram was surrounded by a wreath of laurel and the text "Centenary 1984–1985" was printed underneath for the club's centenary season. The laurel was removed and the text reading "Derby County FC" returned from the next season. In 1993, the ram faced left again and the text was removed once more. From 1995, the ram faced right and was enclosed in a diamond, with a gold banner reading "Derby County FC" underneath and the text "1884" (the year of the club's foundation) underneath that. The design was changed again in 1997 (see left): the ram now faced left and the golden banner now simply read "Derby County"; the diamond and year of formation were removed.

A decade later, in 2007, the badge was modified again with the ram still facing left and the text "Est. 1884" now in the middle of a circular frame featuring "Derby County Football Club" in gold lettering, with the colours being modified to the club colours of black and white in 2009 (see top of page). In July 2012, the club announced its intention to show only the iconic ram, now just an outline, on future shirts, rather than the full club logo. In July 2013, this traditional ram became the club's full logo again.

Colours
Derby County's original colours (right) were amber, chocolate and blue, though by the 1890s the club had adopted its now traditional colours of black and white, which are still in use today. In the 1970s and 1980s, colours for home matches were white shirts with small blue or red touches (on the club badge or shirt makers insignia), blue shorts and socks that were blue, red, white or a combination of the three. The colours of away kits have varied widely, and although they are usually yellow/gold or blue, the colour for the away kit for the 2008–09 season was fluorescent green. The club also introduced a surprise third kit in August 2008. Similar in design to the club's away kit of the 1970s, with blue and white stripes and reminiscent of the Argentina national team strip, the style was re-introduced following feedback from fans who said it was one of their favourite kits from the club's past.

Club mascot

Derby's mascot is a ram named Rammie, who also works to maintain the club's links with fans and the East Midlands in general, such as school visits to promote literacy and charity events. Rammie originally emerged as a more friendly option to the club's traditional links with the British Army and the Mercian Regiment in particular.

Rammie was the first full-time mascot in British football. Rammie's traditional activities include penalty shoot-outs with members of the crowd at half-time, with Rammie as goalkeeper, and warming the crowd up before the match and encouraging the Derby fans during matches. Rammie is a very popular figure amongst Rams fans and, in 2005, released his first DVD, which features the character reading from Aesop's Fables in the Derbyshire countryside.

Shortly thereafter, Rammie was joined by a female equivalent and his sister, named Eweie. However, Eweie did not last very long at Pride Park, and took a reported "vacation" to the United States. She returned from a 10-year exile on 3 October 2015 at a home match against Brentford.

Grounds

As an offshoot of the cricket club, Derby County's first home stadium was the County Cricket Ground, also known as the Racecourse Ground, where the club played between 1884 and 1895. Although the ground itself was good enough to hold the first FA Cup final match outside London, when Blackburn Rovers beat West Bromwich Albion 2–0 in the 1886 FA Cup final replay, and a full England international, disputes over fixture clashes between the football and cricket clubs meant that when the opportunity to play at Sir Francis Ley's Baseball Ground arose, the club accepted.

Commonly referred to amongst supporters as "the BBG", the club moved to the Baseball Ground in 1895 and remained there for the next 102 years, despite opportunities to move in the 1920s and 1940s. Derby had already played there, a 1–0 win over Sunderland during the 1891–92 season, as an alternative venue after a fixture clash at the County Ground. At its peak during the late 1960s, the ground could hold around 42,000 – the club's record attendance achieved following the opening of the Ley Stand with a 41,826 crowd watching a 5–0 defeat of Tottenham Hotspur on 20 September 1969. From this peak, the continued addition of seating saw the capacity drop over the next 15 years to 26,500 in 1985.

Following the Taylor Report in 1989, and the legal requirement for all-seater stadia, the ground's capacity dwindled to just 18,500 by the mid-1990s, not enough for the then ambitious second-tier club. Despite initially hoping to rebuild the Baseball Ground to hold 26,000 spectators, and rejecting the offer of two sites elsewhere in Derby, then-chairman Lionel Pickering announced in February 1996 the intention to move to a new, purpose-built stadium at the newly regenerated Pride Park, with the last first-team game at the Baseball Ground being in May 1997, a 1–3 home defeat to Arsenal, though it continued to host reserve matches until 2003. Derby's new ground, named Pride Park Stadium, was officially opened by the Queen on 18 July with a friendly against Italian club Sampdoria following on 4 August.

Derby hold the unique distinction of being the only club to have had three home grounds host full England internationals. England beat Ireland 9–0 at the Racecourse Ground in 1895, beat Ireland again, 2–1, at the Baseball Ground in 1911 and, most recently, Pride Park hosted England's 4–0 win over Mexico in May 2001.

Pride Park was renamed the iPro Stadium on 7 December 2013, as part of a 10-year, £7 million sponsorship deal with global sports drink company iPro. At the beginning of 2017, it reverted to its original name of Pride Park Stadium.

Clowes Developments (UK) Ltd purchased Pride Park from Mel Morris on 17 June 2022.

Supporters and rivalry

Support
Derby is often acknowledged as a "passionate football town" by rival supporters and the press alike. Tony Francis of The Daily Telegraph noted, "Derby is a passionate football town... Even in Division Two, it's a reasonable bet that crowds at Pride Park would not fall far below 30,000. It's historical, it's geographical, it's in the blood. Some places have it, some don't." During the 2007–08 Premier League season, Derby County fans were repeatedly referred to as the best in the country (England) due to their loyalty despite the club's disastrous campaign. Almost every home match at Pride Park Stadium was sold out to the Derby fans and the club also had a large following away from home. The recognition included them being named fans of the season in much national coverage of the season, winning an award from Nuts magazine, and being named the most loyal supporters in the country in a 2008 survey by Sky Sports Magazine. In 2013, Derby supporter Nick Webster was voted Championship Fan of the Year.

Statistically, the club had the 12th-highest average attendance in the country in the 2007–08, 2008–09, and 2009–10 seasons, despite only having the 15th-largest club ground and finishing 18th or lower in their respective division. In 2008–09, they were the best supported club in the Championship, with a larger average attendance than nine Premier League clubs, and had the Football League's single largest league match attendance, with 33,079 against Wolverhampton Wanderers on 13 April 2009. Since moving to the Pride Park Stadium in 1997, Derby's average attendance has never dropped before 23,000 and they have finished in the top 20 for highest average attendances in 19 out of 23 seasons, despite spending the majority of the time in the second tier.

Derby's celebrity supporters include actors George Clooney and Robert Lindsay, former Labour MP Dennis Skinner, Irish singer Niall Horan, Blur guitarist Graham Coxon, The Gaslight Anthem guitarist Alex Rosamilia, adult film star Keiran Lee and actor Jack O'Connell. It has been reported that O'Connell has persuaded other celebrities to support the club, including actress Angelina Jolie, and model Cara Delevingne.

Rivalries
Derby's primary rival clubs are Nottingham Forest, Leicester City and Leeds United.

Meetings between the side are known as East Midlands derbies and the winning team is awarded the Brian Clough Trophy. The rivalry as a whole largely developed from the 1970s, due to former Derby manager Brian Clough taking over at Forest, much to the anger of the Derby fans. The rivalry has been seen to be as much about which club owns Clough's heart as the proximity of the clubs geographically.

The rivalry with Leicester City stems largely from geographical location rather than any shared history.

Leeds United are disliked due to ongoing friction from the early 1970s when Derby and Leeds were two of the top English teams and the scarcely concealed hostility between their respective managers, Brian Clough and Don Revie and is documented in the novel and film The Damned United. This rivalry is traditionally stronger on Derby's side: while Derby consider Leeds their second or third-biggest rivals, Leeds fans focus more on their dislike of Manchester United and Chelsea, however the rivalry intensified once more in the 2018–19 season following the 'Spygate' scandal, play-off semi-final and increased animosity between the managers, staff and fans of both clubs.

A 2019 study called ‘The League of Love And Hate’ reported Derby fan's top five rivals as Nottingham Forest (88%), Leicester City (64%), Leeds United (63%), Stoke City (43%) and Aston Villa (30%). Derby themselves appeared in the top fives of Forest (1st – 77%), Leicester (2nd – 60%), Burton Albion (3rd – 56%), Leeds (5th – 30%) and Stoke (5th – 28%).

Players

Current squad

Out on loan

Women's team

Notable former players

English Football Hall of Fame members
Several ex-players/managers associated with Derby County are represented in the English Football Hall of Fame, which was created in 2002 as a celebration of those who have achieved at the very peak of the English game. To be considered for induction players/managers must be 30 years of age or older and have played/managed for at least five years in England.

2002 –  Brian Clough   Peter Doherty  Peter Shilton  Dave Mackay
2008 –  Steve Bloomer
2010 –  Francis Lee
2013 –  Raich Carter
2014 –   Hughie Gallacher
2016 –   John Robertson 
2017 –  Frank Lampard

Football League 100 Legends
The Football League 100 Legends is a list of "100 legendary football players" produced by The Football League in 1998, to celebrate the 100th season of League football. Eight former Derby players made the list.

  John Goodall
  Steve Bloomer
  Hughie Gallacher
  Raich Carter
  Peter Doherty
  Dave Mackay
  Peter Shilton
  Paul McGrath

The Jack Stamps Trophy (Player of the Year)

Derby County's Player of the Season award is voted for by the club's supporters and named in honour of Jackie Stamps, who scored two goals in Derby's sole FA Cup final victory in 1946. It was first introduced in the 1968–69 season.

Player of the decade (1970s-2010s)
To mark the 50th anniversary of Derby's First Division Championship, the BBC polled fans to identify the Rams' best players for the five decades since 1972. For the 1970s, Kevin Hector received most votes; for the 1980s, Bobby Davison; for the 1990s, Dean Saunders; for the 2000s, Mart Poom, and for the 2010s, Craig Bryson.

Club management

Coaching positions

Board of directors and ownership

 Owner and Chairman:  David Clowes
Club Secretary and Board Member: Richard Tavernor
Board Member: Ian Dickinson
 CEO: Stephen Pearce
 Club Ambassadors: Roy McFarland; Roger Davies

Managerial history

Below is a list of all the permanent managers that Derby County have had since the appointment of Harry Newbould in 1900. In the 16 years prior to Newbould's appointment, the team was selected by club committee, a standard practice by football clubs at the time.

Club academy

Moor Farm
Derby County's academy, called Moor Farm, is a purpose-built complex situated near the city suburb of Oakwood. It was built in 2003, at a cost of £5 million, to replace the club's previous academy, The Ram-Arena, which was based at Raynesway. When opening the academy, then-Chairman Lionel Pickering said that the intent was to have "at least eight players from the Academy... in the first-team within three years." Although this was not achieved, the academy produced a number of notable players, including England international midfielder Tom Huddlestone, Wales international defender Lewin Nyatanga, Northern Ireland international goalkeeper Lee Camp, England under-21s players Miles Addison and Lee Grant, as well as England under-19 player Giles Barnes.

In April 2009, new manager Nigel Clough announced his intention to restructure the academy, appointing former Derby players Darren Wassall and Michael Forsyth and Wolverhampton Wanderers Academy director John Perkins to the backroom staff, replacing the departed Phil Cannon, David Lowe and Brian Burrows. Following this, and an increased investment of £1 million per year from the club, a number of players broke through to the first team squad ahead of the 2010–11 season, almost a third of the Derby squad were academy graduates, with Mason Bennett setting the club record for youngest first team appearance when he made his full debut with a start in a defeat at Middlesbrough on 22 October 2011 at the age of 15 years and 99 days old. This helped strengthen the academy's reputation and reinforced CEO Tom Glick's stated desire to make Moor Farm "the academy of choice in the Midlands." In August 2012, Derby's academy became a tier 2 academy under the new controversial Elite Player Performance Plan. It was awarded Tier 1 status two years later in July 2014. Focus on the academy continued during the ownership of Mel Morris after his purchase of the club later that year and, at the end of the 2019–20 season Derby had given more first-team minutes to players aged under 21 than any other club in the Football League Championship, with academy graduates such as Max Bird, Louie Sibley, Jason Knight, Jayden Bogle, Morgan Whittaker and Lee Buchanan getting a total of 7,946 minutes in the league during the campaign. When discussing targets for the 2020–21 campaign, Morris stated "We are not going to see a team of 11 players from the Academy featuring this season (2019/20) but the target for next season (is) 50% of our starting 11 should be Academy players. That (is) our target, and I think there is a possibility we could get there."

Derby County in Europe

Derby first competed in Europe when they entered the 1972–73 European Cup after winning the 1971–72 First Division Title, reaching the semi-final stages, where they lost 3–1 on aggregate to Juventus in controversial circumstances. They had qualified for the 1970–71 Fairs Cup after finishing the 1969–70 First Division in 4th, but were banned from entering the competition for financial irregularities. The 70s was  Derby County's peak in English football, and they qualified for Europe in three of the next four seasons, competing in the UEFA Cup or the European Cup in each of the three seasons between 1974–75 and 1976–77.

The club then declined rapidly and has not appeared in the top European competitions since, though it finished in 5th in the 1989 First Division which would have guaranteed entry into the 1989–90 UEFA Cup had English Clubs not been banned from Europe following the Heysel Stadium Disaster.

Outside of major competition, the club competed in the Anglo-Italian Cup between 1992–93 and 1994–95, reaching the final in 1993, losing 3–1 to Cremonese at Wembley.

Records and statistics

Kevin Hector holds the record for Derby County appearances in all competitions, appearing 589 times in two spells with the club between 1966 and 1982. He sits ahead of Ron Webster, who played 535 times for the club, often in the same team as Hector. Just counting league appearances, Hector is again in the lead with 486 appearances, ahead of Jack Parry, who played 483 times for the club between 1948 and 1967.

The club's all-time top goalscorer is Steve Bloomer, often referred to as "Football's First Superstar", who netted 332 goals for the club in two spells between 1892 and 1914. He is over 100 goals ahead of second in the list Kevin Hector, who netted 201 goals for the club. Jack Bowers holds the club record for most goals in a single season, when he scored 43 goals (35 in the league and a further 8 in the FA Cup), during the 1932–33 season.

The club's record attendance is 41,826, for a First Division match against Tottenham Hotspur at the Baseball Ground on 20 September 1969, which Derby won 5–0. The record is unlikely to be broken in the near future as Derby's current stadium, Pride Park Stadium, has a limit of 33,597 spectators. The record attendance at Pride Park for a competitive Derby County match is 33,378 for a Premier League match against Liverpool on 18 March 2000. The largest crowd to ever watch a Derby County game is 120,000 when Derby County played Real Madrid at the Santiago Bernabéu Stadium in the 1975–76 European Cup.

Derby's historically poor 2007–08 Premier League campaign saw the club set and equal several unwanted records in English football. The club equalled Loughborough's all-time league record of just one win in an entire league season. They also equalled or set several Premier League records (1992–present), including fewest home wins in a season (1, joint with Sunderland), least goals (20, initially set, but now held jointly with Sheffield United) fewest away wins in a season (0, joint with five other clubs), and most defeats in a season (29, joint with three other clubs). Unmatched records include fewest points in a season (three points for a win) with 11; and worst goal difference (−69). The club also holds the joint record for most consecutive league games without a win (with Macclesfield Town), with 36 matches over two seasons between 22 September 2007 and 13 September 2008.

Derby also own (alongside Watford), the joint record for most lopsided defeat in an FA Cup final, a 6–0 loss to Bury in 1903.

All-time XI

As part of the club's 125th Anniversary celebrations, it was announced that during 2009 each month a vote would be carried out to decide on the club's official All Time XI, starting in February 2009 with the goalkeeper, with the following eight months offering opportunities for Derby's support to select a team based within a 4–4–2 formation, with December's vote being reserved for the manager. Voting closed on the 25th of each month, with the winner being announced in the following few days.

Top 10 Derby goals
On 2 June 2009, the club announced the supporters choice of the Top 10 Goals in the club's history, with the fans then asked again to choose their favourite from the 10 nominated. The list was obviously biased in favour of more recent goals, largely thanks to the increased coverage modern football enjoys. Three goals featured from the club's 2008–09 campaign. The winners were announced on 22 June 2009.

Honours and achievements
Note: the leagues and divisions of English football have changed somewhat over time, so here they are grouped into their relative levels on the English football league system at the time they were won to allow easy comparison of the achievement

 First Division/Premier League (Tier 1) 
 Champions (2): 1971–72, 1974–75
 Runners-up: 1895–96, 1929–30, 1935–36
 Second Division/Division One/Championship (Tier 2) 
 Champions (4): 1911–12, 1914–15, 1968–69, 1986–87
 Runners-up promotion: 1925–26, 1995–96
 Play-off Winners: 2006–07
 Play-off Runners-up 1993-94, 2013-14, 2018-19
 Third Division North/Third Division/League one (Tier 3) 
 Champions (1): 1956–57
 3rd place promotion: 1985–86
 FA Cup
 Winners (1): 1945–46
 Runners-up: 1897–98, 1898–99, 1902–03
 FA Charity Shield 
 Winners (1): 1975
 Texaco Cup
 Winners (1): 1971–72
 Watney Cup
 Winners (1): 1970
 Anglo-Italian Cup
  Runners-up: 1992–93

Source

References

External links

 DCFC.CO.UK – Official Site
 Official Derby County F.C Fan Engagement Site
 Derby County Fans Online 
 TheRams.co.uk – Derby Evening Telegraph Rams site.
 BBC Sport Derby County  – BBC's Derby County section.

 
1884 establishments in England
Association football clubs established in 1884
Football clubs in Derbyshire
Sport in Derby
Football clubs in England
The Football League founder members
English Football League clubs
Premier League clubs
EFL Championship clubs
FA Cup winners
Companies that have entered administration in the United Kingdom